"I Wish" is an R&B song recorded by American singer-songwriter R. Kelly, from the album TP-2.com. It was released as the album's first single. It spent three weeks at number one on the U.S. R&B chart and peaked at number 14 on the U.S. Hot 100 chart. The song is dedicated to his mother as well as friends and other loved ones of his who have died. This song was originally going to feature rapper 2Pac, but he died before recording his verse. The remix, which was titled "I Wish - Remix (To the Homies That We Lost) featured Hip Hop duo Boo & Gotti, who were then signed to his Rockland Records imprint.

Music video

The official music video for the song was directed by Kelly and Christopher Erskin. R. Kelly's daughter Joann Kelly is featured in the video.

Awards and nominations

Grammy Awards
2001, Best R&B Vocal Performance - Male (nominated)
MTV Video Music Awards
2001, Best R&B Video (nominated)
NAACP Image Awards
2001, Outstanding Music Video (won)
Soul Train Music Award
2001, Best R&B/Soul Single, Male (won)
BMI Urban Awards
2001, Most-Performed Song (won)

Legacy

Sampling
"Villuminati" by J. Cole from the album Born Sinner (2013)

Charts

Weekly charts

Year-end charts

Certifications

References

2000 singles
Jive Records singles
Music videos directed by Christopher Erskin
Music videos directed by R. Kelly
R. Kelly songs
Song recordings produced by R. Kelly
Songs written by R. Kelly
2000 songs